Xingguo Temple, may refer to:

 Xingguo Temple (Jinan), in Jinan, Shandong, China
 Xingguo Temple (Binzhou), in Binzhou, Shandong, China
 Xingguo Temple (Qin'an County), in Qin'an County, Gansu, China